is a Japanese voice actor and singer. He is represented by the voice actor management firm, 81 Produce, and was previously represented by Arts Vision. In 1988, he voiced the character Tetsuo Shima in the movie Akira, which was adapted from the manga of the same name. He also provided the voice of Yusuke Urameshi in the anime adaptation of the manga YuYu Hakusho and returned to that role in video games for that franchise. He is sometimes mistaken for fellow voice actress Nozomi Sasaki, whose name is written the same way. Sasaki has emerged the victor of the Seiyū Grand Prix (in which votes were collected to compile a top ten list of voice actors) more times than any other voice actor.

Sasaki was known for having a high-pitched voice, but by 1998 it became lower due to constantly overworking in voice acting and singing, although it was suspected at first that the reason his voice changed was due to his constant smoking and drinking. He's an avid reader and can speak English.

Filmography

Television animation
1986
Doteraman (Tanki)

1988
Yoroiden Samurai Troopers (Shin Mori a.k.a. Suiko no Shin (Shin of the Torrent))

1989
Momotaro Densetsu (Momotarou)

1992
YuYu Hakusho (Yusuke Urameshi)

1994
Magic Knight Rayearth (Guru Clef)
Captain Tsubasa J (Tsubasa Ozora (adult)) 

1996
Gundam X (Olba Frost)

1997
Ehrgeiz (Hal)
Revolutionary Girl Utena (Ruka Tsuchiya)

1998
Weiß Kreuz (Nagi Naoe)
Cardcaptor Sakura (Eriol Hiiragizawa)

1999
Monster Farm (Hare)

2002
The Prince of Tennis (Jin Akutsu)

2003
Naruto (Gekko Hayate)

2004
 Fafner in the Azure (Hiroto Douma)
 Yu-Gi-Oh! Duel Monsters (Shadi, Priest Shada)
 Monster (Johan Liebert)
 Samurai Champloo (Yukimaru)
Kyo Kara Maoh! (Daikenja & Janus)

2005
Blood+ (Karl Fei-Ong)

2007
Death Note (Mello)

2014
 World Trigger (Hyrein)

2015
Fafner in the Azure: EXODUS (Hiroto Douma)
Garo: Crimson Moon (Shijō Kintō)

2017
Pocket Monsters: Sun & Moon (Hayate (Horacio))

2019
7 Seeds (Takahiro Aramaki)
Blade of the Immortal -Immortal- (Kagehisa Anotsu)

2021
Getter Robo Arc (Messiah Tyr)

2022
Eternal Boys (Makoto Kakizaki)

Unknown date
Soreike! Anpanman (Mezamashi-kun)
Majin Tantei Nougami Neuro (Yuuya Higuchi)
Maximo (The Grim Reaper)
Rurouni Kenshin OVAs (Enishi Yukishiro and Gentatsu Takatsuki)
Solatorobo: Red The Hunter (Blanck)
Shigurui: Death Frenzy (Seigen Irako)
Tetsuwan Tantei Robotack (Robotack)
Yagami-kun's Family Affairs (Shigeki Yaoi)

Original video animation (OVA)
Bubblegum Crisis (1987) (Mackie Stingray)
Legend of the Galactic Heroes (1988) (Julian Mintz)
Earthian (1989) (Chihaya)
Here is Greenwood (1991) (Kazuya Hasukawa)
The Heroic Legend of Arslan (1991) (Eram)
Ushio & Tora (1992) (Ushio Aotsuki)
Please Save My Earth (1993) (Hajime Sakaguchi)

Theatrical animation
Akira (1988) (Tetsuo Shima)
Char's Counterattack (1988) (Hathaway Noa)
Doraemon: Nobita and the Spiral City (1997) (Pibu)
Fafner in the Azure: Heaven and Earth (2010)  (Hiroto Douma)
Gothicmade (2012)
Yu-Gi-Oh!: The Dark Side of Dimensions (2016) (Shadi Shin)
In This Corner of the World (2016)
Mobile Suit Gundam: Hathaway (2021) (Gass H. Huguest)

Video games

Tekken 2 (1995) (Lee Chaolan)
Tactics Ogre: Let Us Cling Together (1996) (Sega Saturn version)
Valkyrie Profile & Valkyrie Profile: Lenneth (????) (Lucio)
Ehrgeiz (1998) (Cloud Strife, Zack Fair; PS1 version)
Tekken Tag Tournament (1999/2000) (Lee Chaolan)
Atelier Iris 3: Grand Phantasm (2006) (Edge Vanhite)
Super Robot Wars series (????) (Olba Frost, Hiroto Douma)
The King of Fighters 2001 (2001) (K9999)
The King of Fighters 2002 (2002) (K9999)
Jump Force (2019) (Yusuke Urameshi)

Tokusatsu
Tetsuwan Tantei Robotack (1998) (Robotack) 
Bakuryu Sentai Abaranger (2003) (Trinoid 19: Hagetakaraichi (ep. 35))
Mahou Sentai Magiranger (2005) (Hades Warrior God Wyvern (ep. 35 - 46))
Battle Cats! (2008) (Saburou Neko-no-tama)
Doubutsu Sentai Zyuohger vs. Ninninger the Movie: Super Sentai's Message from the Future (2017) (Gillmarda)

Dubbing

Live-action
Brian Austin Green
Beverly Hills, 90210 (David Silver)
Domino (Brian Austin Green)
Impact Point (Holden Gregg)
Cross Wars (Callan)
BH90210 (Brian Austin Green/David Silver)
The Schouwendam 12 (Rogier van Pallant (Benja Bruijning))
SEAL Team (Sonny Quinn (A. J. Buckley))
Station Eleven (Arthur Leander (Gael García Bernal))

Animation
Thomas the Tank Engine & Friends (Edward the Blue Engine (Season 9-present replacing Yasuhiro Takato))

Discography

Singles
 [1989.11.29] "Yappari Koi Darou"
 [1991.08.04] "Be My Tabu"

Album
 [1990.05.30] HEART SCANDAL
 [1990.12.28] Junjou
 [1992.11.06] rumblefish
 [1995.06.21] Different Beat
 [1996.08.21] I'm in The Mood
 [1997.08.01] DOUBLE DIRECTION

Mini Album
 [1992.01.11] BABYLON
 [1995.12.26] FLARE

Best Album
 [1993.07.28] Taste of tears
 [1993.07.28] Colors of smile

Live Album
 [1996.04.19] Concert Tour "Flare'95" LIVE

References

External links
 

1967 births
Living people
Male voice actors from Hiroshima Prefecture
Japanese male pop singers
Japanese male video game actors
Japanese male voice actors
20th-century Japanese male actors
Arts Vision voice actors
81 Produce voice actors
21st-century Japanese male actors
20th-century Japanese male singers
20th-century Japanese singers
21st-century Japanese male singers
21st-century Japanese singers